Lead Mine or Leadmine may refer to:

 Lead mine, for the mining of lead

Places

United States
 Leadmine, Missouri, an unincorporated community
 Lead Mine, West Virginia, an unincorporated community in Tucker County
 Lead Mine, Wisconsin, an unincorporated community in Lafayette County
 Leadmine Wildlife Management Area, in Holland and Sturbridge, Massachusetts

Elsewhere
 Lead Mine Pass, a mountain pass in Hong Kong